A mayoral election took place in Arlington, Texas, on May 4, 2019. The election was officially non-partisan.

Jeff Williams, the incumbent mayor, was elected to a third and final term in office.

Candidates
The filing deadline for candidates was February 15, 2019.

Chris "Dobi" Dobson, substitute teacher  and candidate for mayor in 2013 and 2017
Ashton Stauffer
Jeff Williams, incumbent mayor
Ruby Faye Woolridge

Results

References

Arlington mayoral
Arlington
2019
Non-partisan elections